Rolling Hills Memorial Park is a cemetery in Richmond, Contra Costa County, California, established in 1960. The site has approximately 50,000 interments.

Notable interments
 Nicholas Caldwell (1944–2016), Singer
 Proverb Jacobs (1935–2016), Football player
 Joe Morgan (1943–2020), Major League Baseball player
 Louis H. Narcisse (1921–1989), Religious leader
 Vada Pinson (1938–1995), Major League Baseball player

References

External links
 Rolling Hills Memorial Park website
 
 

Cemeteries in California
Buildings and structures in Richmond, California